Manuel Rafael Huerta Ladrón de Guevara (born 12 July 1960) is a Mexican politician who currently serves as the coordinator of federal programs for the Mexican state of Veracruz. Ladrón de Guevara is a former federal deputy and was a founding member of the Party of the Democratic Revolution in 1989 and National Regeneration Movement in 2011 (as a civil association).

Life

Ladrón de Guevara graduated with a law degree from the Universidad Veracruzana. He was a federal deputy in the LV Legislature (1991–94) with the PRD and the LXII Legislature (2012–15) through the PT. Between 2015 and 2018, Huerta was the president of the state executive committee of Morena in Veracruz. He resigned from the party committee on November 27, 2018, in order to accept President Andrés Manuel López Obrador's invitation to become the coordinator of federal programs in the state.

References

1960 births
Living people
People from Mexico City
20th-century Mexican lawyers
Members of the Chamber of Deputies (Mexico)
Party of the Democratic Revolution politicians
Labor Party (Mexico) politicians
20th-century Mexican politicians
21st-century Mexican politicians
Morena (political party) politicians
Deputies of the LXII Legislature of Mexico
Universidad Veracruzana alumni